Felix Dodds is a British author, futurist, and activist. Born as Michael Nicholas Dodds he took the name Felix Dodds, when he was 18.  He stood in Mid Derbyshire for the Liberal Democrats in the 2019 General Election. He has been instrumental in developing new modes of stakeholder engagement with the United Nations, particularly within the field of sustainable development. His latest book is Tomorrow's People and New Technology: Changing How We Live Our Lives. In 2019 he was the UK candidate to be the Executive Director of the United Nations Environment Programme. Dodds was the Executive Director of the Stakeholder Forum for a Sustainable Future from 1992–2012. He is probably best known as the author of How to Lobby at Intergovernmental Meetings: Mine is a Café Latte, written with co-author Michael Strauss.

Dodds has produced a trilogy of books known as the Vienna Cafe Trilogy, which covers the history of sustainable development at the global level. He wrote the third book in the series, Negotiating the Sustainable Development Goals (2017), with Ambassador Donoghue and Jimena Leiva Roesch. The other two are the 2014 From Rio+20 to the New Development Agenda written by Jorge Laguna Celis and Liz Thompson, and the 2012 Only One Earth – The Long Road via Rio to Sustainable Development written by Michael Strauss and Maurice Strong. The books look at the Rio+20 process and outcomes and the last forty years and the challenges for the future. His previous books include the Water, Food, Energy and Climate Nexus edited with Jamie Bartram, which takes up the themes of three of his other books on human and environmental security. These are Biodiversity and Ecosystem Insecurity edited with Dr. Ahmed Djoghlaf UN Convention on Biological Diversity Executive Secretary. This is a companion book to Climate Change and Energy Insecurity, an edited volume with Andrew Higham and Richard Sherman, and Human and Environmental Security: An Agenda for Change. The books argue that the new paradigm facing the world is the interface between environmental, human, and economic security considerations. Dodds believes this is due to the failure of developed countries to deliver on promises made during the 1992 Rio Earth Summit and the 2002 World Summit in Johannesburg.

Human and Environmental Security: An Agenda for Change was nominated for the International Studies Association Sprout Award in 2006 for the most significant publication in the field of environmental studies.  In 2010, Green Eco Services listed him as one of the twenty-five environmentalists ahead of their time.

He has two children.

Early years
Dodds was born in Allestree in Derby. He was influenced at an early age by the visions of John F. Kennedy, Martin Luther King Jr. and Robert F. Kennedy. Dodds went on to study physics at the University of Surrey, where he was very active in student politics. He contributed much of his time to the Anti-Apartheid Movement and the Surrey Students Union, for which he served as Deputy President between 1977 and 1978. After university, Dodds went on to teach mathematics and physics, first at the Khartoum International Community School, and then in London at the Harlington Community School .

Political work (1980–1990)
Early in his career, Dodds was active in UK politics and involved himself with the Anti-Apartheid Movement and the Anti-Nazi League. Dodds simultaneously began to engage with environmental issues such as acid rain, nuclear power and ozone depletion. He held numerous positions in the Liberal Party between 1983 and 1987 and became chairperson of the party's "young wing," the National League of Young Liberals (NLYL), in 1985.

Dodds was a key instigator in the rebellion against the SDP-Liberal Alliance leadership of David Steel and David Owen over the issue of an independent nuclear deterrence. The rebel alliance produced the publication Across the Divide: Liberal Values on Defence and Disarmament, which outlined the Liberal Party's historic opposition to the UK having an independent nuclear deterrent. This resulted in a major defeat to the leadership in 1986, by twenty-three votes at the Liberal Party Conference defence debate in Eastbourne.

After serving the NLYL, Dodds published his first book, Into the Twenty-First Century: An Agenda for Political Realignment. His work called for closer cooperation between Green members on the left in British politics. Contributors to the book included: Jonathon Porritt, Jean Lambert, Peter Hain, Simon Hughes, Michael Meadowcroft, Sara Parkin, Petra Kelly in Germany, Jeremy Seabrook, Peter Tatchell and Hilary Wainwright. In 1988, Dodds co-founded Green Voice, which worked for two years to create a dialogue between Green members on the left of UK politics. In 2018 he published his autobiography about those years: Power to the People: Confessions of a Young Liberal Activist 1975–1988.

Leadership at the UN (1990–present)
Since 1990, Dodds has been active within the United Nations network, originally as Director of the United Nations Environment and Development, UK Committee (UNED-UK). This organization evolved into the UNED Forum, eventually leading to its successor organization, the Stakeholder Forum for a Sustainable Future. These organizations played a critical role in mobilizing support for the Johannesburg World Summit on Sustainable Development in 2002 and Rio+20 in 2012. In the months leading up to the highly publicized meeting, Stakeholder Forum's Earth Summit website was used by stakeholders as the primary non-UN online resource. For the Rio+20 conference, Stakeholder Forum was a partner to the UN to engage stakeholders in the conference.

In 2000, Dodds's book, Earth Summit 2002: A New Deal, outlined many of the key issues for the Summit two years before it occurred.

Dodds has co-founded global Non-governmental organization coalitions for a number of United Nations processes, including the annual United Nations Commission on Sustainable Development (UN CSD), the 1996 UN-HABITAT II Conference, and the 1999 World Health Organization Health and Environment Conference in London.

Dodds co-chaired the NGO coalition at the UN CSD from 1997 to 2001 and is credited with proposing to the UN General Assembly in 1996 the introduction of Stakeholder Dialogues at the United Nations.  Dodds has played a role in their development since that time and is an advocate for the involvement of stakeholders in the decision-making process and implementation of global agreements. He has argued that we are in a process of transition from representative democracy – Madison democracy to a participatory democracy – Jeffersonian Democracy. Dodds contends that at present, we are in a period of stakeholder democracy, and trying, at various levels within society, to develop the structures, vocabulary, and institutions to embed this phase. He believes such developments will strengthen world democracy. In 2019 he outlined his theory of stakeholder democracy in his book Stakeholder Democracy: Represented Democracy in a Time of Fear.

Since 2004, Dodds has been working on the emerging agenda of human and environmental security. His book, Human and Environmental Security: An Agenda for Change, produced with Tim Pippard of Jane's Information Group, outlines the critical issues of this new agenda. Dodds argues that due to the failure of donor governments to fund the agendas stemming from summits at Rio and Johannesburg, many environmental issues are now becoming security dilemmas.

He has held a number of positions, including Member of the Green Globe Task Group to advise the Foreign Secretary on issues of sustainable development; Member of the International Advisory Board for 'Down to Earth – sustainable consumption in the 21st Century; Member of the Board of the Montreal International Forum; The Co-Chair International Steering Committee for Rio+8; Member of the International Advisory Board for the 2001 Bonn Freshwater Conference; A Commissioner of the Commission on Globalisation; A Member of the International Steering Committee for the Conference Hilltops to Oceans; A Bremen Partnership Award Judge; Member of the Advisory Group for the 2006 Basque Sustainable Development Conference; Member of the G8 (Russian Government) International Advisory Council of Non-governmental Organizations.

Dodds has, in the past, advised the European Union, the governments of Denmark, and the UK at intergovernmental events. Dodds also served as an advisor on civil society to the Russian Government for the 2006 G8 Summit. From 2006 to 2007, he was a member of the UNEP Global Environmental Outlook 4 Outreach Advisory Committee and is a former board member of the Montreal International Forum.

He was selected by the United Nations Department for Public Information (DPI) and NGOs to chair the UN DPI Conference on "Sustainable Societies; Responsive Citizens" (which input to Rio+20). He was part of a number of advisory boards for Rio+20, including the global scientist's conference in 2012, Planet Under Pressure, the German Government sponsored conference Water, Energy and Food Security Nexus in the Green Economy, and the Government of Abu Dhabi-sponsored conference Eye on Earth Summit framework committee and stakeholder advisory committee.

Current positions
Felix Dodds is an International Ambassador for the City of Bonn. He is an Adjunct Professor in Environmental Sciences and Engineering, a  Senior Affiliate of the Water Institute at the University of North Carolina, and an Associate Fellow at the Tellus Institute in Boston. He was co-director of the Nexus 2014 and 2018: Water, Energy, Food, and Climate Conference. He advises a number of organizations working on post-2015 development goals. He is a writer and was for twenty years Executive Director of Stakeholder Forum for a Sustainable Future from 1992 to 2012 and was President of Amber Valley Liberal Democrats until 2021.

He has had a semi-regular column, 'Food for Thought' in the Stakeholder Forum newsletter Outreach which is published daily at UN meetings such as the UN Commission on Sustainable Development and UNFCCC. He has been an occasional writer for Inter Press Service and the BBC's website and Forbes and Inter-Press Service News Service. He has taken up blogging on sustainable development and Twitter.

Works
 Dodds, F., MP Hughes, S. MP Kirkwood, A., MP Meadowcroft, M., et al. 1986, Across the Divide: Liberal Values on Defence and Disarmament Hebden Bridge
 Dodds, F., (Ed.), 1988. Into the 21st Century – An Agenda for Political Realignment. London: Green Print
 Dodds, F., & Haskin, M., 1988. The Politics of Realignment. In: F. Dodds (Ed.), Into the 21st Century – An Agenda for Political Realignment, London: Green Print
 Dodds, F., & Roddick, J. 1993. Agenda 21's Political Strategy. In: C. Thomas (Ed.): Rio: Unravelling the Consequences. London: Frank Cass
 Grimshaw, C., Hussain, I., Dodds, F. & Stringer, S., 1995. Connections Earth. London: Two Can & Watts Books
 Dodds, F., 1996 Sustainable Communities – the Broader Agenda. In Millennium Partnerships for Sustainable Regeneration, Greenwich: Docklands Forum & Greenwich Waterfront Community Forum
 Dodds, F., (Ed.), 1997. The Way Forward – Beyond Agenda 21. London: Earthscan
 Dodds, F., 1997. The Adventures of Change. In: F. Dodds (Ed.), The Way Forward – Beyond Agenda 21. London: Earthscan
 Bigg, T. & Dodds, F., 1997. The UN Commission on Sustainable Development. In: F. Dodds (Ed.). The Way Forward – Beyond Agenda 21.  London: Earthscan
 Dodds, F., 1997. Indicators for Citizens. In: Kirdar, Uner. (Ed.), Cities Are for People. New York: United Nations
 Dodds, F. & Bigg, T., 1997. NGOs and the UN System Since the Rio Summit: The NGO Steering Committee for the Commission on Sustainable Development. In Implementing Agenda 21: NGO Experiences from around the World,  UN Non-Governmental Liaison Service. Geneva: UN NGLS
Dodds, F., 1999. Introduction In Strauss, M., The Dialogue Records. New York. CSD NGO Steering Committee Northern Clearing House
Dodds, F., 1999. Foreword, In: Girardet, H., Creating Sustainable Cities. Totnes: Green Books
Dodds, F., (Ed) 2000 & 2002. Earth Summit 2002 – A New Deal.  London. Earthscan
Dodds, F., 2000 and 2002. Reforming the International Institutions. In F. Dodds (Ed.). Earth Summit 2002 – A New Deal. . London: Earthscan
Dodds, F., 2000. CSD NGO Steering Committee, In Kunugi, T., and Schweitz, M., Codes of Conduct for Partnership in Governance. Japan: The United Nations University
Dodds, F. & Narain, S., 2000. Challenges for the Future: Co-Chairs perspectives of the Rio+8 Copenhagen NGO Roundtable Forum. In We Have One Earth.  Copenhagen: The Danish 92 Group
Dodds, F., 2001. From The Corridors To The Table – The Evolution Of The CSD NGO Steering Committee. In M. Edwards (Ed.): Global Citizen Action.  New York: Reinner
Dodds, F., 2001, Preface to the Revised Edition, In Earth Summit 2002 A New Deal, London Earthscan
Dodds, F., From Rio to Johannesburg. In The Road to Earth Summit 2002  The Heinrich Boell Foundation, Washington Heinrich Boell Foundation
Dodds, F., 2002, Multi-stakeholder Process in Context of Global Governance Reform, In M. Hemmati, (Ed.), Multi-stakeholder Processes for Governance and Sustainability Beyond Deadlock and Conflict, London. Earthscan
Dodds, F., 2002, From Rio to Johannesburg, Cooperation South, New York, United Nations Development Programme
Dodds, F., 2002, From Rio via The Hague to Johannesburg: the role of multi-stakeholder dialogues, In Water Science and Technology – Balancing Competing Water Uses Present Status and New Prospects, . Stockholm, IWA Publishing
Dodds, F., with Strauss M., March 2004 and 2006, How to Lobby at Intergovernmental Meetings or Mine is a Café Latte, London, Earthscan
Dodds, F., 2004 and 2006, Preface, in Plain Language Guide to the World Summit on Sustainable Development, London Earthscan
Dodds, F and Pippard, T., (Ed.), March 2005, Environment and Human Security – An Agenda for Change. London: Earthscan
Dodds, F. and Pippard, T., 2005, An Agenda for Change, In Environment and Human Security – An Agenda for Change. London Earthscan
Sherman, R., Peer, J., Dodds, F., and Figueroa Kupcu, M., 2006, Strengthening The Johannesburg Implementation Track , Considerations for Enhancing the Commission on Sustainable Development's Multi Year Programme of Work. London Stakeholder Forum for a Sustainable Future
Dodds, F., Peer, J., Sherman, R., 2006. Some Way, But Not All Way on UN Reform, on the BBC web site.
Dodds, F., 2007, Emerging Stakeholder Democracy: A New Style of Diplomacy, In Cooper, A. and Hocking B., Worlds Apart?  Exploring the Interface between Governance and Diplomacy. Japan, United Nations University
Dodds, F., Strauss, M., Howell, M., & Onestini, M., 2007, Negotiating and Implementing MEAs: A Manual for NGOs, Nairobi UNEP
Dodds F., Sherman, R., 2007, Climate and the UN: A new bid for control?, on the BBC web site
Dodds, F., 2007, Foreword, In NGO Diplomacy: The Influence of Nongovernmental Organizations in International Environmental Negotiations, Edited by Michele M. Betsill and Elisabeth Corell, MIT Press
Dodds, F., Strauss, M., 2008, Sacrificing the Millennium Goals would be a real crisis  on the BBC web site
Dodds, F., Osborn, D., Stoddart, H., Strandenaes, J.G., 2008, Donostia Declaration on Rio+20 Stakeholder Forum for a Sustainable Future
Dodds, F., Higham, A., and Sherman, R., (Ed.) 2009, Climate and Energy Insecurity. London, Earthscan
Dodds, F., Sherman, R., 2009, A multilateral system for climate and energy security: what roles for existing institutions? In  Climate Change and energy Insecurity. London, Earthscan
Dodds, F., Strauss M., 2009, Dreaming of a green Christmas  on the BBC web site
Dodds, F., Strong, M., 2010, Reviving the Spirit of Rio  on the BBC web site
Dodds, F., Strandenas, J.G., 2010, Input to the Consultative Group on International Environmental Governance London Stakeholder Forum for a Sustainable Future
Djoghlaf, A., Dodds, F., (Ed.) 2011, Biodiversity and Ecosystem Insecurity: A Planet in Peril. London Earthscan
Djoghlaf, A., Dodds, F., 2011, A Panet in Peril In Djoghlaf, A., Dodds, F., (Ed) Biodiversity and Ecosystem Insecurity: A Planet in Peril. London Earthscan
Dodds, F., Sherman, R., 2011, Governing Biodiversity, In Djoghlaf, A., Dodds, F., (Ed.) Biodiversity and Ecosystem Insecurity: A Planet in Peril. London Earthscan
Dodds, F., 2012, Foreword, In The Tierra Solution: Resolving Climate Change Through Monetary Transformation,  by Frans C. Verhagen, Cosimo Inc
Dodds, F., Strauss, M., with Strong, M., 2012, Only One Earth: The Long Road via Rio to Sustainable Development. London Earthscan
Dodds, F., 2012, Travelling to tomorrow – stakeholders on the same planet, In G.Lipman, T.Delacy, R. Hawkins and M. Jiang(Ed.), Green Growth and Travelism – Letters from Leaders, London. Goodfellow Publishers Ltd
Dodds, F. and Nayar, A., 2012, Rio+20 – A New Beginning. Perspectives Issue 8, Nairobi, UNEP
Dodds, F. Peach, R. and Strauss, M. 2013, Acting to Address the Ocean-Related Impacts of Climate Change on Human and National Security, with Recommendations for Priority Actions drawn from the discussions of the Global Conference on Oceans, Climate and Security at the University of Massachusetts Boston, Boston Collaborative Institute for Oceans, Climate and Security, University of Massachusetts Boston
Dodds, F., Thompson, E. and Laguna Celis, J. 2014, From Rio+20 to a New Development Agenda: Building a Bridge to a Sustainable Future, London. Routledge
Dodds, F., Thompson, E. and Laguna Celis, J. 2014, "The Plain Language Guide to Rio+20: Preparing for the New Development Agenda", Apex. New World Frontiers
Lim, H., Luna, S., Rebedea, O., Banisar, D., Dodds, F. and Quinn, M. (Ed), 2015, Governance for Sustainable Development: Ideas for the Post 2015 Agenda, Apex. New World Frontiers
Lim, H., Luna, S., Rebedea, O., Banisar, D., Dodds, F. and Quinn, M. 2015, Volume 1Governance for Sustainable Development: Introduction Governance for Sustainable Development: Ideas for the Post 2015 Agenda, Apex. New World Frontiers
Dodds, F. 2015, Partnerships lessons from the first ten years of Type 2 Partnerships In Lim, H., Luna, S., Rebedea, O., Banisar, D., Dodds, F. and Quinn, M. 2015, In Governance for Sustainable Development: Ideas for the Post 2015 Agenda, Apex. New World Frontiers
Dodds, F. 2015, Key Questions for an interlinked and coherent governance for the review and follow up of the post 2015 agenda and its SDG and the Addis Ababa commitments In Governance for Sustainable Development: Ideas for the Post 2015 Agenda, Apex. New World Frontiers
Bartram, J. Kayser, G., Gordon, B. and Dodds, F., 2015 International Policy,  In Bartram, J. Handbook of Water and Health, London Routledge
Dodds, F., and Strauss, M., 2015 The year of negotiating precariously  London, Guardian
Dodds, F. and Lipman, G., 2015, Once in a lifetime chance for green growth and travelism, London Guardian 
Dodds, F., and Strauss, M., 2015, Maurice Strong - A Sustainable Life , London Guardian
Dodds, F., and Bartram, J., (Ed) 2016 The Water, Food, Energy and Climate Nexus: Challenges and an Agenda for Action, London. Routledge
Dodds, F., and Bartram, J., 2016, History of the Nexus at the Intergovernmental Level in The Water, Food, Energy and Climate Nexus: Challenges and an Agenda for Action, London. Routledge
Dodds. F. and Simons, C., 2016 Principles for the Integration of the Nexus within Business in The Water, Food, Energy and Climate Nexus: Challenges and an Agenda for Action, London. Routledge
Halle, M. and Dodds, F. 2016 Issue No. 20: UNEP AND CIVIL SOCIETY: AN EXCHANGE A New Landscape for Stakeholder Engagement in UNEP?, Nairobi, UNEP
Dodds, F., Donoghue, D. and Roesch, L., J, 2016, Negotiating the Sustainable Development Goals: A Transformational Agenda for an Insecure World, London, Routledge
Dodds, F., Strauss, M. and Charles, J., 2016, Santa's Green Christmas: Father Christmas battles Climate Change, New York, Comics Uniting Nations
Dodds, F. 2017 Emergence of Environment as a Security Imperative in The Oxford Research Encyclopedia of Environmental Science, Oxford, Oxford University Press
Dodds, F. 2018 Power to the People: Confessions of Young Liberal Activist 1975-1988, Apex, New World Frontier
Dodds, F. 2018 People and Pollution UNEP Perspective Paper 30, Nairobi, UNEP
Dodds, F., Bolaji, A., Yeongmoo, C., Popescu,P. Krapp, R., Banisar, D. and McKew, Q. 2018 Volume 3: Governance for Sustainable Development Volume 2: Implementing the 2030 Agenda, Apex, New World Frontier
Dodds, F. 2018 Father of Sustainable Development in Remembering Maurice Strong: Tributes and Reminiscences editors Federico Mayor, Negoslave Ostojic and Roberto Savio, Belgrade, European Center for Peace and Development
Dodds, F. Dering-Klinger, V. Hilali El, M. Cho, Y. Bolaji, A. Popescu, C. Banisar, D. and McKew, Q. 2019 Volume 3 Governance for Sustainable Development: Preparing for the Heads of State Review of the 2030 Agenda for Sustainable DevelopmentNew World Frontiers 
Dodds, F. Dering-Klinger, V. Hilali El, M. Kim, H. Makwe, S. Popescu, C. Banisar, D. and McKew, Q. 2020 Volume 4 Governance for Sustainable Development: Challenges and Opportunities for Implementing the 2030 Agenda for Sustainable Development New World Frontiers 
Dodds, F. 2019 Stakeholder Democracy: Represented Democracy in a Time of Fear, London, Routledge
Dodds, F. Nicklas, S. Hilali El, M. Kim, H. Makwe, S. Popescu, C. Banisar, D. and McKew, Q. 2021 Governance for Sustainable Development: Implementing the 2030 Agenda for Sustainable Development - Governance Challenges, New World Frontiers
Dodds, F. Chopitea-Duque, C. and Ruffins, R. (2021) Tomorrow's People and New Technology: Changing How We Live Our Lives, Routledge
Dodds, F. Spence, C. (2022) Heroes of Environmental Diplomacy: Profiles in Courage, Routledge

References

External links
Official website

Year of birth missing (living people)
Living people
People from Derby
English environmentalists
English non-fiction writers
Sustainability advocates
Green thinkers
Alumni of the University of Surrey
English male non-fiction writers
Liberal Democrats (UK) parliamentary candidates